The 2015 Indonesian Masters Grand Prix Gold (officially known as the Yonex Sunrise Indonesian Masters 2015 for sponsorship reasons) was the twentieth grand prix's badminton tournament of the 2015 BWF Grand Prix and Grand Prix Gold. The tournament was held at the Graha Cakrawala Building, State University of Malang Complex in Malang, East Java, Indonesia December 1–6, 2015 and had a total purse of $120,000.

Men's singles

Seeds

  Srikanth Kidambi (final)
  Tommy Sugiarto (champion)
  H. S. Prannoy (second round)
  Dionysius Hayom Rumbaka (withdrawn)
  Tanongsak Saensomboonsuk (third round)
  Jeon Hyeok-jin (first round)
  Ihsan Maulana Mustofa (third round)
  R. M. V. Gurusaidutt (third round)
  Jonatan Christie (quarterfinals)
  Derek Wong Zi Liang (quarterfinals)
  Anthony Sinisuka Ginting (semifinals)
  Iskandar Zulkarnain Zainuddin (quarterfinals)
  Sony Dwi Kuncoro (third round)
  Firman Abdul Kholik (first round)
  Soo Teck Zhi (quarterfinals)
  Andre Kurniawan Tedjono (first round)

Finals

Top half

Section 1

Section 2

Section 3

Section 4

Bottom half

Section 5

Section 6

Section 7

Section 8

Women's singles

Seeds

  Pusarla Venkata Sindhu (quarterfinals)
  Maria Febe Kusumastuti (quarterfinals)
  Kim Hyo-min (semifinals)
  Lindaweni Fanetri (quarterfinals)
  Tee Jing Yi (second round)
  Chen Jiayuan (withdrawn)
  Lee Jang-mi (second round)
  Liang Xiaoyu (quarterfinals)

Finals

Top half

Section 1

Section 2

Bottom half

Section 3

Section 4

Men's doubles

Seeds

  Mohammad Ahsan / Hendra Setiawan (quarterfinals)
  Chai Biao / Hong Wei (final)
  Liu Xiaolong / Qiu Zihan (withdrawn)
  Angga Pratama / Ricky Karanda Suwardi (quarterfinals)
  Vladimir Ivanov / Ivan Sozonov (first round)
  Li Junhui / Liu Yuchen (semifinals)
  Wahyu Nayaka / Ade Yusuf (quarterfinals)
  Markus Fernaldi Gideon / Kevin Sanjaya Sukamuljo (quarterfinals)

Finals

Top half

Section 1

Section 2

Bottom half

Section 3

Section 4

Women's doubles

Seeds

  Nitya Krishinda Maheswari / Greysia Polii (final)
  Vivian Hoo Kah Mun / Woon Khe Wei (quarterfinals)
  Amelia Alicia Anscelly / Soong Fie Cho (second round)
  Keshya Nurvita Hanadia / Devi Tika Permatasari (second round)

Finals

Top half

Section 1

Section 2

Bottom half

Section 3

Section 4

Mixed doubles

Seeds

  Tantowi Ahmad / Lilyana Natsir (champion)
  Lu Kai / Huang Yaqiong (quarterfinals)
  Praveen Jordan / Debby Susanto (final)
  Edi Subaktiar / Gloria Emanuelle Widjaja (first round)

Finals

Top half

Section 1

Section 2

Bottom half

Section 3

Section 4

References

External links 
 Tournament Link

Indonesian Masters (badminton)
Indonesia
2015 in Indonesian sport
Indonesian Masters Grand Prix Gold